Ashraf Mahmud Linkon (born 6 June 1990) is a Bangladeshi footballer who plays as a midfielder and defender for Sheikh Russell and Bangladesh national football team.

References

1990 births
Bangladeshi footballers
Bangladesh international footballers
Sheikh Russel KC players
Association football defenders
Association football midfielders
Living people